Hugh Carey (1840–1886) was a soldier in the Union Army during the American Civil War. He was awarded the Medal of Honor for his bravery at the Battle of Gettysburg on 2 July 1863. He acted with daring by capturing the flag of the 7th Virginia Infantry, and was twice wounded in the act.

Carey was born in Ireland. He enlisted in the army from New York City in April 1861. He served as a sergeant in the 82nd New York Volunteer Infantry Regiment, and was discharged in May 1864.

See also
 List of Medal of Honor recipients for the Battle of Gettysburg
 List of American Civil War Medal of Honor recipients: A–F

References

External links
 

American Civil War recipients of the Medal of Honor
Irish-born Medal of Honor recipients
People of New York (state) in the American Civil War
Irish emigrants to the United States (before 1923)
Union Army soldiers
1840 births
1886 deaths